Eve Lucinda "Lucy" Fleming (born 15 May 1947) is a British actress.

Biography

Early life and ancestry 
Fleming was born in Nettlebed, England. She is the second daughter of actress Celia Johnson and writer Peter Fleming (brother of James Bond author Ian Fleming). She is a granddaughter of Valentine Fleming, a Conservative Member of Parliament who was killed during World War I in May 1917, and of his widow, Evelyn. 

Amaryllis Fleming was her half-aunt, fathered by Welsh painter and Lucy's great-uncle Augustus John during his relationship with Evelyn. John's sister and fellow artist Gwen was Lucy's great-aunt.

Fleming spent part of her childhood growing up in New Zealand: "My parents packed me off to some friends in New Zealand when I was 16, hoping I would grow up a little and perhaps change my mind about acting. I was quite a tomboy. I ended up at the Bay of Islands, which was just the most beautiful place in the world. I was meant to be looking after the friends' little boy, but I didn't have a clue, and I don't recall doing much of that at all. I loved the country, though."

Career 
Fleming is perhaps best known for her role as Jenny Richards in the BBC post-apocalyptic drama series Survivors, which originally aired from 1975 to 1977. Jenny is the only character to appear in both the first and last episodes of the show. 

Her numerous credits in other British television series include The Avengers, Lydia Bennet in BBC's 1967 Pride and Prejudice series, Maud Ruthyn on the Season 4 episode "Uncle Silas" of the anthology series Mystery and Imagination, Smiley's People, Mr. Bean, the regular role of Jo in Cold Warrior, the first Helen Wycliffe in Wycliffe, A Dance to the Music of Time, Heartbeat, Rosemary & Thyme and Kingdom. More recently she has appeared on the long running radio soap opera The Archers as Miranda, the depressed wife of minor tycoon Justin Elliot, who is played by her real-life husband.

Personal life 
Fleming has been married twice; first to Joseph William Peter Laycock (b. July 1938 – d. 14 December 1980) from 1971 to 1980, by whom she had a daughter Flora Laycock (b. 16 March 1972 – d. 14 December 1980), and two sons Robert Laycock (b. June 1973) and Diggory Laycock (b. December 1975). Her husband and her daughter, Flora, drowned on 14 December 1980 in a boating accident on the Thames. She married her second husband, the actor Simon Williams, in 1986.

Her uncle Ian's literary estate passed to her father Peter after his death. Since Peter's death, Fleming and her sister Kate have controlled Ian Fleming Publications.

References

External links

Lucy Fleming genealogy. Retrieved 21 September 2007.
Times article by Lucy Fleming on her childhood 31 August 2008 
Updated 2012, photos & Lucy's life inc SURVIVORS (as Jenny Richards)

Living people
1947 births
Actresses from Oxfordshire
English people of Scottish descent
English people of Welsh descent
English television actresses
Lucy
Ian Fleming Publications directors
People from Oxfordshire (before 1974)